Coleman-White House, also known as Whitesome, is a historic home located at Warrenton, Warren County, North Carolina.  It was built between 1821 and 1824, and is a two-story, three bay, late Federal style rectangular frame dwelling.  It has a side gable roof, entrance porch with Tuscan order columns, and exterior end chimneys. At the rear is an earlier -story frame dwelling with a gable roof. The front facade features a Palladian entrance with sidelights and Tuscan colonnettes and Palladian window on the second level.

It was listed on the National Register of Historic Places in 1973.

References

Houses on the National Register of Historic Places in North Carolina
Federal architecture in North Carolina
Houses completed in 1824
Houses in Warren County, North Carolina
National Register of Historic Places in Warren County, North Carolina